The NWA International Light Heavyweight Championship was a professional wrestling championship promoted by Último Dragón's Toryumon 2000 Project (T2P) promotion. Although having the "NWA" initials, it was not officially sanctioned by the National Wrestling Alliance. T2P closed a month after CIMA won the title, so CIMA took the title to Toryumon Japan but never defended it. The title was later abandoned when CIMA won the Último Dragón Gym Championship.

Title history

See also
Toryumon
Último Dragón Gym Championship

References
http://www.wrestling-titles.com/japan/dg/t2p-int-lh.html – NWA International Light Heavyweight Championship title history

National Wrestling Alliance championships
Light heavyweight wrestling championships
Toryumon championships
International professional wrestling championships